A salt tax refers to the direct taxation of salt, usually levied proportionately to the volume of salt purchased. The taxation of salt dates as far back as 300BC, as salt has been a valuable good used for gifts and religious offerings since 6050BC. The salt tax originated in China, in 300BC and became the main source of financing the Great Wall As a result of the successful profitability of the Salt Tax, it began filtering through the rulings of nations across the world, France, Spain, Russia, England and India were the main regions to follow the Chinese lead. Salt was used as a currency during the Roman Empire and towards the end of their reign, the Romans began monopolising salt in order to fund their war objectives.  Salt was such an important commodity during the Middle Ages that governments would often incorporate the salt trade as a state enterprise. Salt is one of the longest standing sources of revenue for governments, the taxation policy was so successful due to the vital role of salt within the human diet. Salt Taxing has been extremely influential in many of the political and economic revolts within history, resulting in important historic events including the French Revolution, the Moscow Salt Riot, the Salt March in India, and the Salt Tax Revolt in Spain.

Timeline 
 6050BC – Salt used as part of Egyptian religious offerings and valuable trade between the Phoenicians and their Mediterranean empire
 300 BC – First levied salt tax in China, used to fund the construction of the Great Wall of China
 485 AD – English fish salting became popular
 1360 – First salt tax implemented in France 
 1631 – Salt Tax Revolt begins in Biscay
 1634 – Salt Tax Revolt in Biscay crushed as main advocates were executed
 1648 – Moscow uprising caused by salt tax implementation
 1693 – William III implements salt tax in England
 1696 – The salt tax in England was doubled in order to increase revenue 
 1790 – Post French revolution, salt tax was abolished 
 1806 – Napoleon Bonaparte reinstated the Gabelle in France 
 1825 – Abolishment of the salt tax in England
 1835 – First salt taxes were implemented in India, originally placed by the British East India Company
 1858 – The British crown took over the administration of India 
 1882 – Salt act implemented by the British in India, prohibiting Indians from selling or collecting salt, thus forcing them to purchase the highly taxed salt from British rulers 
 1930 – Mohandas Karamchand Gandhi led the Salt March, part of the Indian independence movement, in protest of the unfair salt tax
 1945 – The Gabelle was abolished following France's liberation from Nazi Germany
 1947 – India gains independence from the British Empire as a result of the Indian independence movement.
 1974 – in Italy the salt tax was abolished.

Implications of salt tax 
The implications of the salt tax were both positive and negative. Salt tax was highly profitable for governments and increased the living standards within many countries. The salt tax was also influential upon historic political events including the Salt March in 1930 and the French revolution in 1790. The revenue from the salt tax allowed some governments to increase living standards, the Chinese government for example used the revenue from salt tax to fund the building of the Great Wall of China. As a result of the salt tax, the price of salt skyrocketed, subsequently meaning many individuals were unable to afford salt. Salt plays a large role in the human diet and salt starvation is a serious health issue which can result in vomiting, coma and death. Many believe that populations revolted against the salt tax through the French revolution and the Salt March as a result of the deaths associated with the lack of salt and high level of social disruption the tax caused. The Moscow Uprising and the Salt Tax Revolt had the highest death tolls and caused the most significant social disruption, however these salt taxations were quickly removed as a result.

Impacted regions

India 
Today, India is one of the leading producers of salt in the world, coming in third behind the US and China. However, the British implementation of the salt tax in India was one of the highest of its kind. In 1835, the British East India Company implemented the first taxation of salt in India, the British East India Company was taken over by the crown in 1858 as a result of the plentiful revenue. Due to India's large population, not everyone was able to afford salt thus often resulting in salt deprivation, many Indians died as a result of the expensive salt taxation, this and other surrounding political problems influenced the Salt March in 1930. The Salt March lead by Mohandas Karamchand Gandhi was a protest in response to the unfair tax and standing up to the rule of the British Monarch, the protest resulted in the independence of India in 1947.

England  
During the commonwealth period, the previously abolished salt tax was reintroduced in 1641, however the tax was revoked in 1660 and not reinstated until 1693 under the reign of William III. The tax was originally set at two shillings a bushel on foreign salt, one shilling on native salt however in 1696 this was doubled and remained until it was abolished in 1825. Salt tax was collected by over 600 officials at the time. The British salt tax was abolished in 1825 as a result of salt becoming an important mineral in the manufacturing processes evolving during the industrial revolution. Much of the impetus behind the repeal of salt duties came from manufacturers wanting to produce sodium carbonate from common salt through the Leblanc process, rather than extracting it from marine plants such as kelp or barilla. Britain's salt act of 1882 prohibited Indians from collecting or selling salt, a staple in their diet.

China

Salt taxation in China dates back to 300 BC, and today China is one of the largest producers of salt in the world. Salt tax has played a large role in Chinese history and their economic development, as salt is considered an essential commodity, it is also one of their largest sources of government revenue . The tax revenue funded the development of the Great Wall, along with funding the Chinese army and several other government development projects. Private salt trafficking was very common in china as monopoly salt was more expensive and lower quality.

France  
The Gabelle, was the French salt tax, initially implemented in 1360 lasting, with brief revisions and lapses until 1946, the Gabelle originated as an indirect tax on agricultural commodities however from 1360 onward was limited solely to the taxation of salt implemented by the French crown.  The Gabelle was one of the most unequal forms of revenue generation in the country's history. The Gabelle was one of the main injustices of the French peasants, as the tax was based on your “tier” within society, so small farmers and poorer urban people were the most affected by the taxation of salt. Salt smuggling was extremely common in France due to the nature of the tax, smugglers could buy salt in an area where it was cheap and sell it in an area where the legal price of salt was much higher. The Gabelle is said to be a large contributing factor to the French revolution however the unfair taxation and financial burden imposed on the lower-class was a main aspect in the populations disconnect.

Roman Empire 
Within the Roman Empire, salt was considered a fundamental part of empire building. The first of the great Roman Empire roads, the Via Salaria or Salt Road was built for transporting salt. The Roman army required salt for their soldiers and horses and often Roman soldiers were paid in salt as it was seen as a valuable currency at the time. The word salary originated from the payment of salt to Roman soldiers and coined the term “worth his salt. ” The Roman government did not follow the influence of the Chinese and did not maintain a monopoly of salt.  The Roman government however did not hesitate to control salt prices when they felt necessary, they often subsidised the price of salt to ensure commoners were able to access salt. In order to finance the war, the government did begin manipulating prices of salt in order to raise funds, despite this there remained a low price within the city of Rome.

Tax avoidance 
Avoiding the high taxation of salt, many individuals smuggled salt in order to provide their families with salt and make profits of their own. Private salt trafficking occurred as monopoly salt was more expensive and of lower quality whilst local bandits and rebel leaders thrived on salt smuggling in both China and France. Smuggling salt was a very serious offence, individuals in French history were executed for salt-smuggling whilst in China offenders were often flayed alive. Whilst the tax remained in England, salt smuggling between Ireland and England was extremely common as Ireland had no salt tax thus Irish salt was smuggled into England.

Tax Resistance 
Tax resistance is the universal refusal to pay tax due to an opposition to the government that is imposing that tax, it is a direct action and if in violation of the tax regulations can be seen as civil disobedience. Tax resisters may accept that law commands them to pay taxes however they choose to resist taxation. The Salt March lead by Mohandas Gandhi is a prime example of tax resistance and is one of the most recognisable tax resistances in history.

Salt Tax Revolt 
Between 1631 and 1634 the Salt Tax Revolt took place within the Spanish province of Biscay. The revolt was in response to economic conflict concerning the price and ownership of salt. The Revolt consisted of several violent incidents opposing Philip IV's taxation policy. The rebellion against the salt tax quickly progressed into a much broader protest against all economic inequalities under Philip IV's reign. The rebellion came to an end in the spring of 1634 as the main leaders of the protest were executed. However, Philip IV overlooked the rest of the group and decided to remove his original order concerning the price and ownership of salt in response to the rebellion.

The Moscow Salt Riot
In 1648 the Moscow Uprising, more commonly known as the Salt Riot began as a result of government implementation of a universal salt tax, replacing other taxes, with the intention of replenishing the state treasury. The price of salt grew exponentially resulting in violent riots within Moscow. The Salt Tax fell mainly on the poorer sections within society, the riot was aggravated due to members of the elite finding ways to evade the tax, resulting in widespread corruption.

Examples
Notable examples of salt taxation throughout history include:
The French Gabelle, which was a contributing factor to the French Revolution.
Salt tax in China: at various times including that under the Salt Commission of Tang and Yuan China. In China, a state monopoly on salt, also known as the salt gabelle, has existed since 119 B.C and lasted until 2014, making it the world's oldest (and possibly first) state monopoly in the world. By the mid-Tang dynasty, taxes on salt brought in more than half of the government's tax revenue, and continued to be a major factor even in the 20th century.
The salt tax in India including that under the British. In India, there had been a tax on salt for hundreds of years but it was greatly increased following the rule of India's provinces by the British East India Company. In salt producing regions such as Orissa, private sale of salt was prohibited, and salt found being transported had to be sold to the British authorities at a fixed price, and, in later years, the production of salt was banned completely. This was done to maintain the high price of British salt by destroying India's long-established tradition of salt-making. In 1858, when Britain took control of the Indian provinces, these taxes remained. Mahatma Gandhi protested this with the Salt March, and it was a contributing factor to the Indian independence movement. Salt played a large role in India's quest for independence. In 1930, Mahatma Gandhi’s famous Salt Satyagraha took place and led to nonviolent protests throughout the provinces of British India. A 24-day, 240-mile march from Sabarmati Ashram to the coastal village of Dandi, Gandhi was going to, at the journey’s end, illegally harvest salt without paying tax to the British Crown. Salt was chosen by Gandhi because its taxation was extremely detrimental to the poorest of Indians and, "Next to air and water, salt is perhaps the greatest necessity of life." Despite the national influence and international recognition gained by the Salt Satyagraha, the salt tax remained until it was repealed by Jawaharlal Nehru, the Prime Minister of the Interim Government, in 1946.
A Russian salt tax led to an uprising known as the Moscow uprising of 1648.
 The solărit tax in the Principality of Moldavia during the 16th-18th century.

Salt tax in alternate form
In 2014, it is still illegal in certain provinces of China to use salt from a neighbor city.

References